Garett Bembridge (born July 6, 1981) is a Canadian former professional ice hockey right winger currently playing for the Kenaston Blizzards of the Sask Valley Hockey League (SVHL).

Playing career
Bembridge was selected by the New York Rangers in the 5th round (137th overall) of the 1999 NHL Entry Draft, and was also selected by the Calgary Flames in the 7th round (207th overall) of the 2001 NHL Entry Draft. He spent his Major Junior career with the Saskatoon Blades of the Western Hockey League.

In addition to playing professionally in the Central Hockey League, Bembridge has also played in the American Hockey League, ECHL, the German DEL2, the Italian Serie A, and the Asian ALH.

For the 2013–14 season, Bembridge played for the Denver Cutthroats of the Central Hockey League.  During the 2013–14 season, Bembridge scored 42 goals and 104 points in 66 regular season games, setting the Cutthroats' single-season regular season points record.  After the regular season, Bembridge was named to the 2013–14 season All-CHL Team, was awarded the Joe Burton Scoring Championship and announced as the Central Hockey League's 2013–14 Most Valuable Player.

On July 9, 2014, Bembridge re-signed with the Cutthroats for the 2014–15 season.  On August 20, 2014, the Cutthroats suspended operations, immediately making Bembridge a free agent.  Later that same day, he signed with the Missouri Mavericks of the then Central Hockey League. On October 7, 2014, it was announced that the Central Hockey League had folded and had joined the ECHL, nullifying Bembridge's Central Hockey League contract with the team.  On October 9, 2014, Bembridge re-signed with the Mavericks under an ECHL contract. After 7 games with the Mavericks, scoring 6 points, Bembridge was traded to inaugural club, the Indy Fuel, on November 12, 2014.

On July 25, 2016, Bembridge left the professional circuit in agreeing to play in a men's senior league in Alberta, with the Rosetown Redwings of the Chinook Hockey League.

Career statistics

Awards and honours

References

External links
 

1981 births
Canadian ice hockey right wingers
Living people
Augusta Lynx players
Calgary Flames draft picks
Denver Cutthroats players
ETC Crimmitschau players
Greenville Swamp Rabbits players
Hartford Wolf Pack players
Idaho Steelheads (ECHL) players
Indy Fuel players
Iowa Stars players
Lowell Lock Monsters players
Las Vegas Wranglers players
Missouri Mavericks players
New York Rangers draft picks
Nikkō Ice Bucks players
Portland Pirates players
Rapid City Rush players
SC Riessersee players
Saint John Flames players
Saskatoon Blades players
Schwenninger Wild Wings players
Syracuse Crunch players
Utah Grizzlies (ECHL) players
HC Valpellice players
Wichita Thunder players
Canadian expatriate ice hockey players in Italy
Canadian expatriate ice hockey players in Germany